Powhatan is a village in Natchitoches Parish, Louisiana, United States. The population was 141 at the 2000 census. It is part of the Natchitoches Micropolitan Statistical Area.

Geography
Powhatan is located at  (31.874012, -93.200083). It is approximately ten miles west of the city of Natchitoches, along the Red River

Demographics

As of the census of 2000, there were 141 people, 55 households, and 36 families residing in the village. The racial makeup of the village was 14.89% White, 78.72% African American, 0.71% Asian, 0.71% from other races, and 4.96% from two or more races.

There were 55 households, out of which 18.2% had children under the age of 18 living with them, 30.9% were married couples living together, 25.5% had a female householder with no husband present, and 34.5% were non-families. 32.7% of all households were made up of individuals, and 21.8% had someone living alone who was 65 years of age or older. The average household size was 2.56 and the average family size was 3.36.

In the village, the population was spread out, with 23.4% under the age of 18, 14.2% from 18 to 24, 14.2% from 25 to 44, 27.7% from 45 to 64, and 20.6% who were 65 years of age or older. The median age was 43 years. For every 100 females, there were 98.6 males. For every 100 females age 18 and over, there were 86.2 males.

The median income for a household in the village was $16,667, and the median income for a family was $17,250. Males had a median income of $12,500 versus $16,250 for females. The per capita income for the village was $9,488. There were 29.7% of families and 40.2% of the population living below the poverty line, including 64.0% of under eighteens and 17.4% of those over 64.

Climate
Climate is characterized by relatively high temperatures and evenly distributed precipitation throughout the year.  The Köppen Climate Classification subtype for this climate is "Cfa". (Humid Subtropical Climate).

References

Villages in Louisiana
Villages in Natchitoches Parish, Louisiana
Populated places in Ark-La-Tex